Annamaria Beatrice "Nina" Amenta is an American computer scientist who works as the Tim Bucher Family Professor of Computer Science and the chair of the Computer Science Department at the University of California, Davis. She specializes in computational geometry and computer graphics, and is particularly known for her research in reconstructing surfaces from scattered data points.

Amenta grew up in Pittsburgh, and majored in classical civilization at Yale University, graduating in 1979. After working for over ten years as a computer programmer, she returned to graduate school, and earned her Ph.D. in 1994 from the University of California, Berkeley with a thesis on relations between Helly's theorem and generalized linear programming, supervised by Raimund Seidel. After postdoctoral study at The Geometry Center and Xerox PARC, she became a faculty member at the University of Texas at Austin, and moved to Davis in 2002. She became the Bucher Professor and department chair in 2013.

Amenta was co-chair of the Symposium on Computational Geometry in 2006, with Otfried Cheong.

References

External links
Google scholar profile

Year of birth missing (living people)
Living people
American women computer scientists
Yale College alumni
University of California, Berkeley alumni
University of Texas at Austin faculty
University of California, Davis faculty
Researchers in geometric algorithms
Computer graphics researchers
Scientists at PARC (company)
American computer scientists
21st-century American women scientists
21st-century American scientists
American women academics